Bausch Health Companies Inc. (formerly Valeant Pharmaceuticals International, Inc.) is  a Canadian multinational specialty pharmaceutical company based in Laval, Quebec, Canada. It develops, manufactures and markets pharmaceutical products and branded generic drugs, primarily for skin diseases, gastrointestinal disorders, eye health and neurology. Bausch Health owns Bausch & Lomb, a supplier of eye health products.

Valeant was originally founded in 1959 as ICN Pharmaceuticals by Milan Panić in California. During the 2010s, Valeant adopted a strategy of buying up other pharmaceutical companies which manufactured effective medications for a variety of medical problems, and then increasing the price of those medications. As a result, the company grew rapidly and in 2015 was the most valuable company in Canada.

Valeant was involved in a number of controversies surrounding drug price hikes and the use of a specialty pharmacy for the distribution of its drugs. This led to an investigation by the U.S. Securities and Exchange Commission, causing its stock price to plummet more than 90 percent from its peak, while its debt surpassed $30 billion. In July 2018, the name of the company was changed to Bausch Health Companies Inc., in order to distance itself from the public outrage associated with massive price increases introduced by Valeant. At the same time, a new ticker symbol, BHC replaced VRX.

History

1959–2002: the Panić years

In 1959, Yugoslavian immigrant Milan Panić, who had defected to the US three years earlier, founded ICN Pharmaceuticals (International Chemical and Nuclear Corporation) in his Pasadena garage. Panić ran the company for 43 years, during which ICN established a foothold in the industry by acquiring niche pharmaceuticals and through the development of Ribavirin, an antiviral drug that became the standard treatment for hepatitis C.

In 1994, ICN merged with SPI Pharmaceuticals Inc., Viratek Inc., and ICN Biomedicals Inc.

On June 12, 2002, following a series of controversies, Panić was forced to retire under pressure from shareholders.

2002–2010: Rebranding as Valeant
In 2003, not long after Panić's ouster, ICN changed its name to Valeant. In 2006, the company received approval in the U.S. to market Cesamet (nabilone), a synthetic cannabinoid. The company also acquired the European rights to the drug for $14 million.

In 2008, the Swedish pharmaceutical company Meda AB bought Western and Eastern Europe branches from Valeant for $392 million. In September 2008, Valeant acquired Coria Laboratories for $95 million. In November 2008, Valeant acquired DermaTech for $12.6 million.

In January 2009, Valeant acquired Dow Pharmaceutical Sciences for $285 million. In July 2009, Valeant announced its acquisition of Tecnofarma, a Mexican generic drug company. In December 2009, Valeant announced its Canadian subsidiary would acquire Laboratoire Dr. Renaud, for C$23 million.

In March 2010, Valeant announced its acquisition of a Brazilian generics and over-the-counter company for $28 million and manufacturing plant for a further $28 million. In April 2010, Valeant announced that its Canadian subsidiary would acquire Vital Science Corp. for C$10.5 million. In May 2010, Valeant acquired Aton Pharmaceuticals for $318 million.

2010–2016: the Pearson years
On September 28, 2010, Valeant merged with Biovail. The company retained the Valeant name and J. Michael Pearson as CEO, but was incorporated in Canada and temporarily kept Biovail's headquarters. Setting on a path of aggressive acquisitions, Pearson ultimately turned Valeant into a platform company that grows by systematically acquiring other companies.

In February 2011, Valeant acquired PharmaSwiss S.A. for €350 million. In March 2011, an attempt to buy drugmaker Cephalon Inc. for $5.7 billion was unsuccessful. In May 2011, former Biovail Corporation Chairman and CEO Eugene Melnyk was banned from senior roles at public companies in Canada for five years and penalized to pay $565,000 by the Ontario Securities Commission. In the year before the merger with Valeant, Melnyk had settled by the United States Securities and Exchange Commission (SEC), and agreed to pay a civil penalty of $150,000 after having previously paid $1 million to settle other claims with the SEC. In July 2011, Valeant acquired Ortho Dermatologics from Janssen Pharmaceuticals for $345 million. The acquisition included the products Retin-A Micro, Ertaczo, and Renova, also known as tretinoin. In August 2011, Valeant acquired 87.2% of the outstanding shares of Sanitas Group for €314 million. In December 2011, Valeant acquired iNova Pharmaceuticals for A$625 million from Australian private equity firms Archer Capital with additional milestone payments of up to A$75 million. In December 2011, Valeant acquired Dermik, a dermatology unit of Sanofi.

In January 2012, Valeant acquired Brazilian sports nutrition company Probiotica for R$150 million. In February 2012, Valeant acquired ophthalmic biotechnology company Eyetech Inc. In April 2012, Valeant acquired Pedinol. In April 2012, Valeant acquired assets from Atlantis Pharma in Mexico for $71 million. In May 2012, Valeant acquired AcneFree for $64 million plus milestone payments. In June 2012, Valeant acquired OraPharma for approximately $312 million with up to $144 million being paid in milestone payments. In August 2012, Valeant agreed to buy skin-care company Medicis Pharmaceutical for $2.6 billion. In January 2013, Valeant acquired the Russian company Natur Produkt for $163 million. In March 2013, Valeant acquired Obagi Medical Products, Inc. In May 2013, the company acquired Bausch & Lomb from Warburg Pincus for $8.7 billion in a move to dominate the market for specialty contact lenses and related products.

In January 2014, Valeant acquired Solta Medical for approximately $250 million. In May 2014, Nestle acquired the commercial rights to  some of Valeant's products for $1.4 billion. In July 2014, Valeant acquired PreCision Dermatology Inc for $475 million, a deal aimed at strengthening the firm’s skin products business. Along with hedge fund manager Bill Ackman, Valeant made a bid to acquire Allergan; however, in November 2014, Allergan announced that it would be acquired by Actavis in a $66 billion transaction. Valeant and Pershing Square were subsequently accused of insider trading prior to their Allergan bid, and eventually settled the case in 2017.

On April 1, 2015, Valeant completed the purchase of gastrointestinal treatment drug developer Salix Pharmaceuticals for $14.5 billion after outbidding Endo Pharmaceuticals. On the final day of trading, Salix shares traded for $172.81, giving a market capitalisation of $10.9 billion. In July 2015, the company announced it would acquire Mercury (Cayman) Holdings, the holding company of Amoun Pharmaceutical, one of Egypt's largest drugmakers, for $800 million. In August 2015, Valeant said it would purchase Sprout Pharmaceuticals Inc for $1 billion, a day after Sprout received approval to market the women's libido drug Addyi. In September 2015, Valeant licensed psoriasis drug Brodalumab from AstraZeneca for up to $445 million. In September 2015, the company announced its intention to acquire eye surgery product manufacturer Synergetics USA, for $192 million in order to strengthen the company's Bausch & Lomb division. In October 2015, the company's Bausch & Lomb division acquired Doctor's Allergy Formula for an undisclosed sum.

In July 2015, Glass Lewis, a proxy advisory firm, called the $3 billion in compensation received by J. Michael Pearson "excessive".

On October 21, 2015, Citron Research founder Andrew Left, a short seller of Valeant shares, published claims that Valeant recorded false sales of products to specialty pharmacy Philidor Rx Services and its affiliates. These specialty companies were controlled by Valeant, and allegedly resulted in improper bookkeeping of revenues. In addition, by controlling the pharmacy services offered by Philidor, Valeant allegedly steered Philidor's customers to expensive drugs sold by Valeant. One alleged practice entailed Valeant employees directly managing Philidor's business operations while posing as Philidor employees, and with all written communication under fictitious names. Valeant responded that the allegations by Citron Research were "erroneous." On October 30, 2015, Valeant said that it would cut ties with Philidor in response to allegations of aggressive billing practices. Walgreens Boots Alliance Inc, owner of Walgreens, took over distribution for Valeant.

In 2018, Gary Tanner, who was a former Valeant executive, and Andrew Davenport, the former chief executive of Philidor Rx Services, were prosecuted over a kickback scheme. They were sentenced to a year in prison after being convicted on four charges, including wire fraud and conspiracy to commit money laundering. They were also ordered to forfeit $9.7 million in kickbacks. Tanner had been responsible for managing Valeant’s relationship with Philidor as well as Valeant’s “alternative fulfillment” program, which the company used to increase prescriptions for its own (expensive) drugs instead of generic substitutes.

An important part of the growth strategy for Valeant under Michael Pearson had been the acquisition of medical and pharmaceutical companies and the subsequent price increases for their products. Valeant's strategy of exponential price increases on life-saving medicines was at the time described by Berkshire Hathaway vice chairman Charlie Munger as "deeply immoral" and "similar to the worst abuses in for-profit education." This strategy had also attracted the attention of regulators in the United States, particularly after the publication in The New York Times of an article on price gouging of specialty drugs.

In September 2015, an influential group of politicians criticized Valeant on its pricing strategies. The company raised prices on all its brand name drugs 66% in 2015, five times more than its closest industry peer. The cost of Valeant flucytosine was 10,000% higher in the United States than in Europe. In late September 2015, members of the United States House Committee on Oversight and Government Reform urged the Committee to subpoena Valeant for their documents regarding the sharp increases in the price of "two heart medications it had just bought the rights to sell: Nitropress and Isuprel. Valeant had raised the price of Nitropress by 212% and Isuprel by 525%". The New York Times columnist Joe Nocera claimed that Valeant CEO J. Michael Pearson's "plan was to acquire pharmaceutical companies, fire most of their scientists, and jack up the price of their drugs".

After Valeant acquired Salix Pharmaceuticals in 2015, it raised the price of the diabetes pill Glumetza about 800%.

Although it did not specifically mention Valeant, an October 2015 Twitter post by presidential candidate Hillary Clinton stated: "Price gouging like this in the specialty drug market is outrageous. Tomorrow I’ll lay out a plan to take it on." In January 2016, she said she would be "going after" Valeant for its price hikes, causing its stock price to fall 9 percent on the New York Stock Exchange. She was unsuccessful in having any impact on drug prices after a failed bid for Presidency in 2016.

By October 2015, Valeant had received subpoenas from the U.S. Attorney's Office for the District of Massachusetts and the United States Attorney for the Southern District of New York in regards to an investigation on Valeant's "drug pricing, distribution and patient assistance program." The House Oversight Committee also requested documents from Valeant amid public concern around drug prices.

In October 2015, the Federal Trade Commission began an investigation into Valeant's increasing control of the production of rigid gas permeable contact lenses. Valeant's acquisition of Bausch & Lomb in 2013, and Paragon Vision Services in 2015, is alleged to have given the company control of over 80% of the production pipeline for hard contact lenses. A series of unilateral price increases beginning in Fall 2015 spurred the FTC's investigation. On November 15, 2016, Valeant agreed to divest itself of Paragon Holdings and Pelican Products to settle charges that its May 2015 acquisition of Paragon reduced competition for the sale of FDA-approved "buttons", the polymer discs used to make gas permeable contact lenses.

From 2015 to 2017, Valeant shares plummeted more than 90 percent. Large hedge funds such as Bill Ackman's Pershing Square Capital Management, Paulson & Co., and Viking Global Investors lost billions. By April 2016, the market value of hedge fund holdings in Valeant had fallen by $7.3 billion. However, hedge fund herding continued to incite hedge fund portfolio managers to continue to buy Valeant shares. In 2016, Pearson was ousted and replaced by Joseph C. Papa, while investor Bill Ackman joined the board. In 2017, Ackman's Pershing Square fund, which held a major stake in the company, sold out for a reported loss of $2.8 billion.

In their 2015 annual report filed on April 29, 2016, Valeant said that it was the "subject of investigations" by the Securities and Exchange Commission, the U.S. Attorney’s Offices in Massachusetts and New York, the state of Texas, the North Carolina Department of Justice, the Senate’s Special Committee on Aging, and the House’s Committee on Oversight and Reform, and had received document requests from the Autorite de Marches Financiers in Canada and the New Jersey State Bureau of Securities."

On April 27, 2016, Bill Ackman, J. Michael Pearson, and Howard Schiller were forced to appear before the United States Senate Special Committee on Ageing to answer to concerns about the repercussions for patients and the health care system faced with Valeant's business model.

2016–2022: Valeant under Joseph Papa
On April 25, 2016, Valeant named Perrigo chief executive Joseph Papa as a permanent replacement for Pearson, and entrusted him with turning around the company. Papa set on a path of strategic sales, debt reduction, and organic growth.

By January 2017, the company had sold its skincare brands to L'Oréal for $1.3 billion and its Dendreon biotech unit to Sanpower for $819.9 million. In June, the company sold iNova Pharmaceuticals for $910 million. In July, the company also divested Obagi Medical Products for $190 million. In November, it announced it would sell Sprout Pharmaceuticals back to its original owners, two years after acquiring the business for $1 billion.

The company was featured in episode 3 of the first season of the Netflix documentary Dirty Money. “Drug Short” explains how Valeant lost 90 percent of its value between 2015 and 2016 taking down billionaires in the process and making an internet heroine of Fahmi Quadir, and a handful of other short sellers. They correctly bet that "the drug company’s price gouging, questionable tactics, and massive debt burden could not be sustained".

Under Papa's leadership, by early 2018, the company had become profitable again; had settled the Allergan case for less than expected; and had lowered its debt by $6.5 billion. The company had divested itself of 13 non-core businesses, reducing its debt to $25 billion, and had settled or dismissed 70 pending lawsuits, including the Allergan insider trading case. On January 8, 2018, the company announced that its Bausch + Lomb unit had received a CE Mark indicating conformity with health, safety, and environmental protection standards from the European Commission for the distribution of its Stellaris product in Europe.

On December 16, 2019, the company settled a shareholder class action lawsuit under Section 11 of the U.S.  Securities Act of 1933, alleging the company misled investors about its business operations and financial performance, for approximately $1.21 billion. The company  denied allegations of all wrongdoing as part of the settlement.

On July 31, 2020, the SEC announced that Bausch Health had agreed to pay a $45 million penalty to settle charges of improper revenue recognition and misleading disclosures in SEC filings and earnings presentations. It also announced that Pearson would pay $250,000 in civil penalties to the SEC, as well as $450,000 to reimburse Valeant. Howard Schiller and Tanya Carro, two other executives who settled, paid the SEC $100,000 and $75,000, respectively.

Recent developments
Following Ackman's exit, Paulson & Co. increased its stake in the company, became its largest shareholder, with its founder, John Paulson, joining the board, and vowing to rebuild the company's core franchises and to reduce its debt. In May 2022, Papa was replaced by Thomas Appio as the company's chief executive officer. Paulson replaced Papa as chairman of Bausch Health after being on its board of directors from June 2017 to May 2022.

Acquisitions

Products
Bausch Health's main products include drugs in the fields of dermatology, neurology, and infectious disease.

Medications
The company's major prescription drugs are:

 Rifaximin (Xifaxan), for treatment of traveler's diarrhea and irritable bowel syndrome with diarrhea
 Budesonide (Uceris), to help get mild to moderate ulcerative colitis under control
 Minocycline (Arestin, Solodyn), an antibiotic used for procedures related to periodontitis
 Efinaconazole (Jublia), for treatment of toenail fungus
 Acne drugs: clindamycin/tretinoin (Ziana), benzoyl peroxide/clindamycin (Acanya, Onexton), tretinoin (Atralin, Retin-A Micro), benzoyl peroxide (Microsphere), tazarotene (Arazlo)
 Pimecrolimus (Elidel), used to treat atopic dermatitis
 Metformin (Glumetza), to improve glycemic control in adults with type 2 diabetes mellitus
 Bupropion (Wellbutrin XL), for treatment of depression
 Isoprenaline (Isuprel), for treatment of mild or transient episodes of heart block
 Tetrabenazine (Xenazine), for treatment of chorea associated with Huntington’s disease
 Sodium nitroprusside (Nitropress), for the immediate reduction of blood pressure of patients in hypertensive crises
 Penicillamine (Cuprimine), to treat Wilson's disease (a condition in which high levels of copper in the body cause damage to the liver, brain, and other organs), cystinuria (a condition which leads to cystine stones in the kidneys), and in people with severe, active rheumatoid arthritis who have failed to respond to an adequate trial of conventional therapy.
 Bexarotene (Targretin), a retinoid for treatment of Cutaneous T-Cell Lymphoma
 Aciclovir (Zovirax), a topical antiviral used against herpes viruses
 Triethylenetetramine (Syprine), used for treatment of patients with Wilson's disease
 Loteprednol (Lotemax) gel, a topical corticosteroid indicated for the treatment of inflammation and pain following ocular surgery

Over the counter products
The company's major over the counter drugs are:

 Ocuvite, an eye vitamin
 PreserVision, an eye vitamin
 ReNu Multiplus, for lubrication of contact lenses
 Biotrue, an eye lubricant
 Artelac, to treat dry eyes
 Boston, for cleaning of contact lenses
 SootheXP, an eye lubricant

References

External links

 

Companies listed on the Toronto Stock Exchange
Pharmaceutical companies of Canada
Canadian brands
Companies based in Laval, Quebec
Pharmaceutical companies established in 1959
1959 establishments in California
S&P/TSX 60
Life sciences industry
Specialty drugs
Tax inversions
Pharmaceutical companies based in New Jersey